Yassine Benzia (born 8 September 1994) is a professional footballer who plays for Azerbaijan Premier League club Qarabağ. Born in France, he represents the Algeria national team. He mainly plays as an attacking or a central midfielder but can also play as a winger or striker.

He began his professional career at Olympique Lyonnais, where he played 53 total games and scored 6 goals, winning the 2012 Trophée des Champions. In August 2015, he was signed by Lille.

Benzia was a France youth international, having represented his nation at under-16, under-17, under-18 and under-21 level. He played with the under-17 team at the 2011 FIFA U-17 World Cup. In March 2016, FIFA approved his request to change his international allegiance to Algeria.

Club career

Lyon
Following the 2011 FIFA U-17 World Cup Benzia signed his first professional contract with Lyon, agreeing to a three-year deal on 27 October 2011. He was subsequently promoted to the senior team by manager Rémi Garde and assigned the number 25 shirt. Benzia made his professional debut on 20 May 2012 in the last game of the league season at home to Nice, appearing as a substitute for Jimmy Briand for the final minutes of the 4–3 loss.

Benzia came on as a 66th-minute substitute for Bafétimbi Gomis in the 2012 Trophée des Champions against Montpellier at New Jersey's Red Bull Arena on 28 July, and scored in Lyon's penalty shootout victory after a 2–2 draw. On 22 November, he scored his first professional goal to open a 1–1 draw at Sparta Prague in the group stage of the UEFA Europa League. He scored again in the competition's next game, a 2–0 win at the Stade de Gerland against Hapoel Ironi Kiryat Shmona, but did not find the net again for the rest of the season.

On 16 August 2013, Benzia scored his first Ligue 1 goal, opening a 3–1 win at Sochaux on the first day of the season and also assisting Alexandre Lacazette and Yoann Gourcuff for the other two goals. He added his only other goal of the season on 8 December in a win by the same score at Bastia.

Lille
On 31 August 2015, Benzia signed a four-year deal at fellow Ligue 1 club Lille for a fee of around €1 million.

On 28 January 2017, after over a year without a goal, Benzia scored both of Lille's goals in a 2–1 win on his return to Lyon.

Fenerbahçe (loan)
On 31 August 2018, the last day of the 2018 summer transfer window, Benzia joined Süper Lig side Fenerbahçe on loan for the season. Fenerbahçe also secured an option to sign him permanently.

Olympiakos (loan)
On 31 August 2019, the last day of the 2019 summer transfer window, Benzia joined Superleague Greece side Olympiakos on loan for the season.

Qarabağ
On 26 January 2023, Benzia signed for Qarabağ on a contract until 30 June 2025.

International career
In January 2016, Algerian Football Federation president Mohamed Raouraoua announced that Benzia had opted to switch his international allegiance to Algeria. In March 2016, FIFA approved his request to change his international allegiance to Algeria. On 26 March 2016, he played his first game for Algeria, against Ethiopia in the 2017 Africa Cup of Nations qualification. He scored his first senior international goal on 2 June 2016 against Seychelles.

Style of play
At the age of 17, Benzia was dubbed the new Karim Benzema.

Career statistics

Club

International

International goals
As of match played 2 June 2016. Algeria score listed first, score column indicates score after each Benzia goal.

Honours

Club
Lyon
Trophée des Champions: 2012

International
France U19
UEFA European Under-19 Championship runner-up:2013

Individual
UEFA European Under-19 Championship: Team of the Tournament 2013

References

External links

 Yassine Benzia's personal web site
 
 
 
 
 
 

1994 births
Living people
People from Saint-Aubin-lès-Elbeuf
Association football forwards
Algerian footballers
Algeria international footballers
French sportspeople of Algerian descent
Olympique Lyonnais players
Lille OSC players
Fenerbahçe S.K. footballers
Olympiacos F.C. players
Dijon FCO players
Hatayspor footballers
Ligue 1 players
Süper Lig players
Super League Greece players
France youth international footballers
France under-21 international footballers
Algerian expatriate footballers
Expatriate footballers in Turkey
Algerian expatriate sportspeople in Turkey
Sportspeople from Seine-Maritime
Footballers from Normandy